Adelphi Road–UMGC–UMD is a light rail station that is currently under construction. It will be part of the Purple Line in Maryland. The station will be located on the west border of the University of Maryland at the intersection of Adelphi Road and Campus Drive.

History 
The Purple Line system is under construction as of 2022 and is scheduled to open in 2026.

Station layout
The station consists of an island platform on the median of Campus Drive, just south of University Boulevard and east of Adelphi Road.

References

Hyattsville, Maryland
Purple Line (Maryland)
Railway stations scheduled to open in 2026
Transportation in Prince George's County, Maryland
Railway stations in Prince George's County, Maryland
University of Maryland, College Park facilities
Railway stations in Maryland at university and college campuses